Gornji Mihaljevec is a village and municipality in Međimurje County, in northern Croatia.

History

The oldest archaeological finds in Gornji Mihaljevec municipality are from the Roman period. Fragments of Roman roads were found in the villages of Preseka, Prhovec, Martinuševec and Tupkovec. These fragments are part of a road that  led from Poetovio to Carnuntum

The settlement Gornji Mihaljevec is first time mentioned in charter issued in year 1478 as Michalowecz Maius. In year 1789 Catholic parish of Saint Catherine was established in Gornji Mihaljevec.

In October 1931 villages Badličan, Preseka, and Prhovec were separated from Čakovec District and the rest of Međimurje and placed under authority of Ptuj District in Drava Banovina. But only month later, in November 1931, all three villages were again reincorporated in Međimurje.

Municipality of Gornji Mihaljevec was established in year 1997.

Geography

 
Gornji Mihaljevec is located in part of Međimurje called Gornje Međimurje at border with Slovenia. Village of Gornji Mihaljevec, municipality centre, is about 15 kilometres west from Čakovec, and some 100 kilometres north of Zagreb. The municipality covers an area of 32.15 km2.

Landscape of Gornji Mihaljevec consist of low hills called Međimurske gorice, covered with vineyards, orchards and woodlands.
There is a border crossing with Slovenia in village of Preseka. Border crossing connects municipality with village of Središče ob Dravi .

Demographics

In the 2011 census, the municipality had a population of 1,917 in 12 villages. Gornji Mihaljevec is experiencing population decline since the 1950s. The majority of inhabitants are Croats making up 97% of population.

Settlements

Culture
The church of Saint Catherine was built at the end of the 17th century at the site of former wooden chapel.

References

Populated places in Međimurje County
Municipalities of Croatia